The Scullers Head of the River Race is a rowing race held annually on the River Thames Championship Course from Mortlake to Putney, open to single scullers only.  The race is  held in November or early December each year on a week usually to suit the mid-morning or mid-afternoon timing of the ebb tide.

History
The Scullers Head was first raced in 1954 when it was won by John Marsden. It now admits entries of over 500 scullers and is the largest sculling race in the UK for a single class of racing shell.  The race gains enough entries to organise the greatest number of marshalls for any singles event on the Thames and it draws considerably more overseas single scullers than the same race held in reverse usually three to four weeks before, the Wingfield Sculls, which dates to the middle of the 19th century.

In 2014 were the first admissions of categories for adaptive rowing for athletes with disabilities, in TA and LTA adaptive rowing classifications.

Annual organisation
The race is organised by Vesta Rowing Club, Putney, London.

Results since 1990

Men

Women

See also
Metropolitan Regatta The London Cup (singles).  Held in late May/very early June at Eton-Dorney Lake.
Diamond Challenge Sculls rowed by race-winning singles at Henley Royal Regatta, forming the second prerequisite of the rare accomplishment of a 'Triple Crown' with those above and below.  Held in July.
Wingfield Sculls rowed by singles along the course in reverse, the last component of the 'Triple Crown'.  Held in October or early November. Where the Scullers' Head is also won there is the theoretical possibility of a 'Quadruple Crown' for a single sculler able to win all four events.  As the Diamond Sculls is not open to women, a win at the Scullers Head forms the last leg of the UK's Triple Crown for an all-round champion female single sculler.
Rowing on the River Thames

References

External links
Scullers Head

Mortlake, London
Rowing in the United Kingdom
Water sports in London
1954 in sports
Head races
Recurring sporting events established in 1954